Garry Laffan (born 1975) is an Irish politician and former hurler who played as a full-forward for the Wexford senior hurling team.

Laffan made his first appearance for the team during the 1994 Oireachtas Tournament and subsequently became a regular member of the starting fifteen until his retirement prior to the 2002 championship. During that time he won one All-Ireland medal and two Leinster medals.

At club level Laffan is a county football championship medalist with Glynn-Barntown GAA.

Playing career

Club
Laffan plays his club hurling and football with Glynn-Barntown GAA and has had some success.

After winning several championship medals in the under-21 hurling grade, Laffan subsequently became a dual player with the club's top sides. In 1996 he lined out in the senior football championship decider. A defeat of Kilanerin gave Laffan a Wexford Senior Football Championship medal.

Laffan has ended up as county hurling championship runner-up on three occasions.

Inter-county
Laffan first came to prominence on the inter-county scene as a dual player with the Wexford under-21 teams.

He made his senior debut in an Oireachtas Tournament semi-final victory over Waterford in 1994. Laffan subsequently became a regular player during the following year's National Hurling League.

In 1996 Laffan lined out in his first provincial decider at senior level. Reigning champions Offaly provided the opposition and had held the upper-hand against Wexford in a series of games stretching back to 1979. On that day Wexford had a 2–23 to 2–15 victory, securing a Leinster medal for Laffan. The subsequent All-Ireland final pitted Wexford against Limerick for the first time in over forty years.  Tom Dempsey was the hero of the day as he scored a goal after nineteen minutes to give Wexford an advantage. His side led by 1–8 to 0–10 at half-time in spite of having Éamonn Scallan sent off. Wexford took a four-point lead in the second-half; however, this was whittled back to two points as Wexford hung on for the last twenty minutes. The final score of 1–13 to 0–14 secured the All-Ireland title for Wexford and a medal for Laffan.

Laffan added a second Leinster medal to his collection in 1997 following a 2–14 to 1–11 defeat of Kilkenny.

The following few years saw a decline in form for Wexford and Laffan left the panel in 2002.

Managerial career

Wexford
Following his retirement as a player, Laffan became involved in team management. In 2010 he joined Tony Dempsey's under-21 hurling management team as a selector.  During his three seasons as a selector, Wexford made some progress. The team reached two provincial finals only to lose out on both occasions to Dublin.

Political career
Laffan is currently a Fianna Fáil councillor on Wexford County Council, after his election in the 2019 Irish local elections.  He was the mayor of Wexford from 2021 to 2022.

References

1975 births
Living people
Glynn-Barntown hurlers
Glynn-Barntown Gaelic footballers
Wexford inter-county hurlers
Wexford inter-county Gaelic footballers
All-Ireland Senior Hurling Championship winners